Mousa Shanan Zayed (born 9 March 1994) is a Qatari tennis player.

Career
Zayed mainly plays on the futures circuit and has also competed for the Qatari Davis Cup team since he was 14, where he holds a 24–25 record, the second largest number of wins for the country.

Zayed has received wildcards into the main draw of the singles and doubles of the Qatar Open in both 2013 and 2014. In 2013 he faced Frenchman Gael Monfils in his opening match, but only won three games in a straight sets loss. At the singles event of the 2014 competition, he faced grand slam champion Andy Murray in his opening match, however, was dominated in a straight sets defeat without winning a single game, suffering the third double bagel loss of his career. Zayed dropped out of the ATP rankings for the second time in December 2014, after losing his only ranking point.

References

External links

 
 
 

1994 births
Living people
Qatari male tennis players
Tennis players at the 2010 Asian Games
Tennis players at the 2014 Asian Games
Asian Games competitors for Qatar